Gatecon is a fan convention centered on the Stargate television franchise. The first Gatecon was held in 2000 in Vancouver, Canada, with the convention being held annually until 2008. Since 2008 the event has been held sporadically. The event has included tours of the Stargate SG-1 (1997–2006), Stargate Atlantis (2004–2009) and Stargate Universe (2010–2011) sets at The Bridge Studios.

A number of different charities have been supported by Gatecon, including Make A Wish Foundation, Sea Shepherd Conservation Society and Cystic Fibrosis Canada, with MGM and the shows creators providing props and memorabilia to be auctioned off.

History

The event was conceived by four fans of the series: Allan Gowen from Australia, Sue Seeley from the United States and Richard Pasco and Kathryn Rogers from the United Kingdom. The group first came up with the idea in 1998 and spent the following two years trying to attract the attention of MGM and Showtime, before holding the first Gatecon in 2000 in the city of Vancouver due to its close proximity to The Bridge Studios in Burnaby, Canada where Stargate SG-1 was filmed. Hank Cohen, the then president of MGM Television was so impressed with the group, he flew from Los Angeles to attend the first event. Gatecon celebrated its 5th Anniversary in July 2004, which was a sell out with 700 attendees. It had around 30 guests over the 3-day event. It was also the first time Amanda Tapping, Christopher Judge, and Michael Shanks had a panel together at Gatecon. Charity auctions and donations took place for Cystic Fibrosis Canada and Make A Wish Foundation. 

The year 2006 marked the first time Gatecon was held in the United Kingdom, with the event taking place at the University of Gloucestershire campus in Cheltenham. The positive response meant that the event returned to the UK the following year in 2007, this time in Reading. In 2008, Gatecon returned to Vancouver, Canada and featured Gatecon's first appearance of Richard Dean Anderson, who portrays Jack O'Neill in Stargate SG-1 and its spinoff series Stargate Atlantis and Stargate Universe. The events charity auction of props and memorabilia raised over USD 28,000 for Sea Shepherd Conservation Society, of which Anderson is a member of the board. In 2009, it was announced that Gatecon 2010 would be the last, with Richard Pasco commenting: "Gatecon has had an incredible run, and the fans, actors, and studios have been amazingly supportive of us, but we have decided to go out on a high note after our tenth convention". Pasco attributed the decision to end Gatecon as being down to the increase in corporate run conventions. The event raised over USD 100,000 across the weekend for the Sea Shepherd Conservation Society.

After a six year hiatus, it was announced that Gatecon would return in 2016. Fundraising from the event would go towards Sea Shepherd Conservation Society as well as Sanctuary for Kids, a charity founded by Amanda Tapping. The event again returned in 2018, titled Gatecon: The Invasion, taking place in September 2018, at the Sheraton Vancouver Airport hotel. A 20th Anniversary Gatecon called Full Circle had been scheduled for 2020, however was postponed due to COVID-19. Instead, recordings from previous Gatecons were made available online to stream. The 20th Anniversary was eventually rescheduled for September 1-5 2022 and renamed The Celebration, taking place in Vancouver once more. The online magazine, The Companion announced in May 2022 that they would be partnering with Gatecon 2022. The fansite Dial the Gate also announced that they would be partnering with Gatecon and streaming at least two of the panels live onto Youtube. Numerous props and a replica Stargate were displayed at the 2022 event.

Events

References

External links
 

Stargate
Science fiction conventions in Canada
Science fiction conventions in the United Kingdom